The Unstoppable is the third studio album by the Nigerian R&B artist 2face Idibia, released in 2008, through his label Hypertek Entertainment. The album was produced by J Sleek, Jiggy Jegg, Mic Tunes, Ozzy, Spanky with one track "Flex" produced by R. Kelly and featuring him on the track.

The first and only single from the album was the pre-released "Enter The Place", in anticipation of the release of the album. The single featured the Nigerian recording artist Sound Sultan.

The release of the original album was marred with a number of delays and difficulties and relatively poor reviews as actual sales of the album in comparison to the initial two solo albums Face 2 Face and Grass 2 Grace were below expectations.

2face Idibia went on to release a new fourth album called The Unstoppable International Edition that contained some of the materials of the album with some other added tracks.

Track listing
"Intro"		
"Enter the Place" (featuring Sound Sultan)
"Take It Back" (featuring Cartier)
"Outside" 
"Can't Do Without You" (featuring Melissa Briggs)
"Free" (featuring Lil Ehi Idibia)
"Pako" 
"So Proud" (Remix) (featuring Chaka Demus & Pliers)
"Flex" (featuring R. Kelly and Natz)
"Oh Papa"
"Go Down There" (featuring Sway)
"Excuse Me Sister"
"Appreciate It" 
"Jungle Don Mature"
"I Sing"
"See It Coming" (featuring Wyre)
"Fly"
"Outro"

The Unstoppable International Edition (2010)

The Unstoppable International Edition is the fourth studio album by the Nigerian R&B artist 2face Idibia, released on June 27, 2010, through his label Hypertek Entertainment. As the name suggests, the album is the international edition of the artist's third and previous album The Unstoppable (see above). It is one of the few Nigerian albums to be successfully sold at a retail price of ₦1000.

The album has received generally positive reviews from critics and has produced two more singles which have received a lot of airplay on radios and at various hotspots around Nigeria. The single, "Implication", is an up-tempo party track with Idibia only. The second single, "Only Me", is a slow soul song in which Idibia's lyrics and rhythm fuse every day issues into an enjoyable track. All the singles have their music videos.

The international edition of the album won two awards at the 2010 SoundCity Music Video Awards. The album also won "Best R&B/Pop Album" at the 2011 The Headies. 2 Face won the Channel O Music Video Awards' Best African Western award and the MTV Africa Music Awards for Best Male and Artist of the year.

Accolades

Track listing

References

2008 albums
2010 albums
2face Idibia albums